Loch Fada is a loch located on the Inner Hebridean island of Colonsay, Scotland. It is located at 

The loch consists of a string of three lochs and is a Designated Special Area of Conservation (SAC).

Association
The Royal Navy frigate  was named after the loch.

External links
 Joint Nature Conservation Committee - Loch Fada site details

Fada
Colonsay
Fada